The Man of the Crowd is a 2013 Brazilian drama film directed by Marcelo Gomes based on the short story of the same name by Edgar Allan Poe. It was entirely shot in Belo Horizonte, Minas Gerais with a budget of R$1.8 million. The film was screened in the Panorama section of the 64th Berlin International Film Festival.

Cast
 Paulo André as Juvenal
 Sílvia Lourenço as Margo
 Jean-Claude Bernardet

References

External links
 

2013 films
2013 drama films
Brazilian drama films
Films based on short fiction
Films based on works by Edgar Allan Poe
Films directed by Marcelo Gomes
Films shot in Minas Gerais
2010s Portuguese-language films